The Dizengoff Center suicide bombing (also Purim massacre) was a Palestinian terrorist attack on March 4, 1996 on the eve of the Jewish holiday of Purim. The suicide bomber blew himself up outside Dizengoff Center in downtown Tel Aviv, killing 13 Israelis and wounding 130 more. The attack was the fourth suicide bombing in Israel in nine days, bringing the death toll during that span to over 60.

The attack

The suicide bomber detonated just before 4 pm (GMT+2) outside the Dizengoff Center, the largest shopping mall in Tel Aviv. That day the center was particularly crowded for the eve of Purim. Many in the crowd were children dressed in costume for the holiday. The bomber sought to enter the mall but turned back because of the police presence. Instead, he went into the busy intersection where a large number of pedestrians were crossing the street and set off his 20-kilogram nail bomb. Following the attack, a phone call to an Israeli radio station apparently from a Hamas representative identified the attacker as Abdel-Rahim Ishaq, a 24-year-old resident of Ramallah.

References

External links
The Bat-Chen Diaries
Patches, a memorial film

Suicide bombings in 1996
Israeli casualties in the Second Intifada
Islamic terrorism in Israel
Terrorist incidents in Tel Aviv
Mass murder in 1996
Massacres in Israel
March 1996 crimes
March 1996 events in Asia
1990s in Tel Aviv
Islamic terrorist incidents in 1996
Hamas suicide bombings
Building bombings in Israel
1996 murders in Israel
Terrorist incidents in Israel in 1996
Shopping mall bombings